The Nojigiku Sho (in Japanese: のじぎく賞), is a race for three-year-old mares from the Tokai region in the Aichi Prefectural Horse Racing Association.

Race Details

The race was established in 1963. It is held at Sonoda Racecourse on a 1,700 meter track.

The award is named after a Japanese flower, the Chrysanthemum japonense.

Winners since 2015

Winners since 2015 include:

Past winners

Past winners include:

See also
 Horse racing in Japan
 List of Japanese flat horse races

References

Horse races in Japan